Tales of Poe is a 2014 anthology film directed by independent filmmakers Bart Mastronardi and Alan Rowe Kelly. As of February 2019, the film has grossed over $5k from video sales.

Synopsis
Based on the classic works of Edgar Allan Poe, Tales of Poe is a series of three chilling stories adapted for the screen and based on Poe's Tell-Tale Heart, Cask of Amontillado, and one of his more obscure poems Dreams. Bart Mastronardi wrote and directed his award-winning The Tell Tale Heart starring horror star Debbie Rochon and changes the genders from the original story to female in this macabre story that takes place in a mental asylum. Alan Rowe Kelly wrote, directed and stars in an updated adaptation of The Cask with co-stars Randy Jones and Brewster McCall in a love triangle gone awry in a Giallo styled film of murder, deceit and revenge. The third tale, Dreams, is directed by Bart Mastronardi from an original screenplay by Michael Varrati. Dreams focuses on the surreal and trippy journey of a young woman (Bette Cassatt) trapped between the worlds of life and death from her hospital bed. Other key players in Tales of Poe are genre staples Adrienne King, Amy Steel, Caroline Williams, Andrew Glaszek, Jerry Murdock, Susan Adriensen, Zoë Daelman Chlanda, Cartier Williams, Douglas Rowan, Amy Lynn Best, Carl Burrows, Haley Turner, Lesleh Donaldson, Desiree Gould, Joe Quick, David Marancik, Mike Watt, Tom Lanier and Michael Varrati.

Cast
 Amy Steel as Mother of Dreams/Poetic Narrator
 Adrienne King as Queen of Dreams/Private Nurse
 Caroline Williams as Angel of Dreams
 Debbie Rochon as The Narrator
 Randy Jones as Fortunato Montresor
 Desiree Gould as Nurse Malliard
 Alan Rowe Kelly as Peggy Lamar/Gogo Montresor
 Bette Cassatt as The Dreamer
 Zoë Daelman Chlanda as Sarah Whitman
 Colin Cunliffe as The Suitor
 Lesleh Donaldson as Evelyn Dyck/Woman in Black
 Brewster McCall as Marco Lechresi/Demon of Dreams
 Joe Zaso as Gravedigger
 Michael Varrati as Dr. Tarr

Awards
Best Actress Debbie Rochon, Best Short Bart Mastronardi, Best Editing Alan Rowe Kelly for The Tell Tale Heart at 2011 Buffalo Screams Horror Film Festival
Best Actress Debbie Rochon, Best Actor Alan Rowe Kelly, Audience Choice Bart Mastronardi for The Tell Tale Heart at 2012 Macabre Faire Film Festival

Release 
The film was released on DVD and Digital HD on October 11, 2016.

References

External links
 
 

Films based on The Tell-Tale Heart
Films based on works by Edgar Allan Poe
Films based on multiple works
American independent films